Alburnus nasreddini, also known as the Central Anatolian bleak or Eber bleak, is a species of ray-finned fish in the genus Alburnus, that is endemic to Turkey. It was previously found in Lake Eber and Lake Akşehir and their tributaries, but now is only found in one tributary of Lake Akşehir, the Ortaköy River. Massive amounts of water abstraction and heavy pollution has made most of its previous habitat uninhabitable for this species.

References

nasreddini
Fish described in 1943
Endemic fauna of Turkey
Critically endangered animals